Events in the year 1908 in Portugal.

Incumbents
Monarch: Carlos I until his assassination 1 February, then Emmanuel II

Events
28 January – Municipal Library Elevator Coup
1 February – The Lisbon Regicide, assassination of King Carlos I of Portugal and Luís Filipe, Prince Royal of Portugal
5 April – Portuguese legislative election, 1908.

Arts and entertainment

Sports

Births

13 March – Maria Helena Vieira da Silva, abstract painter (died 1992)
11 June – Francisco Marto, Marian apparition witness, beatified (died 1919)
11 December – Manoel de Oliveira, film director (died 2015)

Deaths
1 February
Carlos I of Portugal, king (born 1863)
Luís Filipe, Prince Royal of Portugal, prince (born 1887)

References

 
1900s in Portugal
Portugal
Years of the 20th century in Portugal
Portugal